Fereshteh Jenabi Namin (born 1948 – ) was an Iranian actress mostly active before the Iranian revolution from 1971 until 1979. She was banned from acting after the revolution and had drug addiction issues. She died on 25 May 1998 at the age of 50.

Filmography
1978: Tuti as Tuti
1977: The Condemned as Zeynab
1976: Speeding naked till high noon 
1973: Ghiamat-e eshgh  as Golrokh
1972: Mehdi in Black and Hot Mini Pants
1972: Shir-too-shir as Mitra
1972: Gozar-e-Akbar
1971: Zan-e Yekshabeh

References

External links

1948 births
1998 deaths
People from Tehran
Actresses from Tehran
Iranian film actresses
20th-century Iranian actresses